Rob Luft (born November 1993) is an English jazz guitarist and composer from London, United Kingdom. He has released two albums, Riser & Life Is The Dancer, as a solo artist on British label Edition Records.

Biography

Luft was born in Sidcup, Greater London, and attended The Judd School from 2005 to 2012. While at this school, he joined the National Youth Jazz Orchestra of Great Britain (2010–2015). He then enrolled at the Royal Academy of Music where, upon graduation, he was the recipient of the Kenny Wheeler Music Prize in association with Edition Records. In 2016, he was awarded the 2nd prize in the guitar competition at Montreux Jazz Festival, adjudicated by John McLaughlin. His debut album as a bandleader was released in 2017 and was warmly received with four star reviews in The Guardian, The Irish Times, Jazzwise and Downbeat Magazine, who described it as "the most fully-realised and rewarding debut album from a guitarist-composer since Julian Lage's 2009 outing". He released his second album on Edition Records, Life Is The Dancer, in April 2020, in the midst of the global COVID-19 lockdown. This eagerly anticipated sophomore album was also received to critical acclaim, with All About Jazz describing it as "balm for the soul" as well as stating that "every aspect of the album is sublime".  He has also performed as a sideman with many of Britain's leading jazz artists, including Django Bates, Laura Jurd, Loose Tubes, Byron Wallen, Tommy Smith and Iain Ballamy. Luft was the recipient of the Peter Whittingham Award in 2015 as part of the co-led big band Patchwork Jazz Orchestra, and in 2018 he was nominated as the "Breakthrough Act of the Year" in the Jazz FM Awards  and as the "Jazz Instrumentalist of the Year" in the Parliamentary Jazz Awards.

Discography

As leader/co-leader

As sideman

References

External links
 Official website

English jazz guitarists
English male guitarists
English jazz composers
1993 births
Living people
21st-century British guitarists
Male jazz composers
21st-century British male musicians
ECM Records artists
Edition Records artists